Daniele Ficagna (born 21 February 1981) is a retired Italian footballer who played as a defender. He is currently the U19 manager of Carrarese Calcio.

Club career
Ficagna was signed by Serie B club S.S. Virtus Lanciano 1924 on 19 March 2014.

On 3 January 2015 he was signed by Savona, after without a club for 6 months.

On 29 August 2015 Ficagna was signed by Lega Pro newcomer Siena.

Coaching career
Retiring at the end of the 2016–17 season, Ficagna was appointed manager of the Carrarese Calcio U17 team. After an excellent season, he was promoted to manager of the clubs Beretti team, also known as the U19's.

References

External links 
 
 
 

1981 births
Italian footballers
People from Piombino
Living people
Spezia Calcio players
A.C. Cesena players
ACF Fiorentina players
A.C.N. Siena 1904 players
Empoli F.C. players
Frosinone Calcio players
S.S. Virtus Lanciano 1924 players
Savona F.B.C. players
A.S.D. Olimpia Colligiana players
Serie B players
Serie C players
Serie D players
Association football defenders
Sportspeople from the Province of Livorno
Footballers from Tuscany